Quock may refer to:

Quock Walker (1753-?), African American slave who sued for and won his freedom
Audrey Quock (born 1977), Asian American model and actress
Quock, alternate spelling of Guo, one of the most common Chinese surnames

See also
Quốc, a Vietnamese given name